Brot may refer to:
Brot (TV series), Icelandic 2019 TV series
Brot., abbreviation in botanical name citations for Portuguese botanist Félix de Avelar Brotero
 Bernd das Brot, "Berndt the Bread", a puppet character on the German children's television channel KI.KA
Das Brot, a short story by Wolfgang Borchert

Surname
Alphonse Brot (1807–1895), French author and playwright
 Auguste Louis Brot (1821-1896), malacologist from Switzerland
Tzvika Brot, mayor of Bat Yam, Israel

See also